Eucalyptus mannifera, commonly known as the  brittle gum or red spotted gum, is a species of small to medium-sized tree that is endemic to south-eastern Australia. It has smooth, powdery white bark, lance-shaped to curved adult leaves, flower buds in groups of seven, white flowers and cup-shaped, hemispherical or conical fruit.

Description
It has smooth, powdery, white or grey bark, sometimes with red patches, and which is shed in short ribbons, flakes or plates. Flowering occurs between January and May and the flowers are white.

Taxonomy and naming
Eucalyptus mannifera was first formally described in 1834 by Robert Mudie from a specimen collected in the Blue Mountains, and the description was published in the Transactions of the Royal Medico-Botanical Society of London. Mudie did not give a reason for the specific epithet (mannifera) but did give the species the common name "manna gum tree".

In 1962, Lawrie Johnson reduced Eucalyptus maculosa and Eucalyptus praecox to subspecies of E. mannifera and Eucalyptus praecox. Three subspecies names have been accepted by the Australian Plant Census:
 Eucalyptus mannifera subsp. gullickii (R.T.Baker & H.G.Sm.) L.A.S.Johnson;
 Eucalyptus mannifera Mudie subsp. mannifera;
 Eucalyptus mannifera subsp. praecox (Maiden) L.A.S.Johnson.

Distribution and habitat
Brittle gum is widespread in south-eastern New South Wales, south from Rylstone and in eastern Victoria. It usually grows in shallow, rocky soils. The subspecies praecox and gullickii only occur in New South Wales and have broader leaves than subspecies mannifera.

References

mannifera
Flora of New South Wales
Flora of Victoria (Australia)
Drought-tolerant trees
Myrtales of Australia
Plants described in 1834